Juan Rubelín Ramírez is a Dominican Republic freestyle wrestler. He is a silver medalist at the Pan American Games and a bronze medalist at the Pan American Wrestling Championships.

Career 

In 2019, he won the silver medal in the 57 kg event at the Pan American Games held in Lima, Peru.

In March 2020, he won one of the bronze medals in the 57 kg event at the Pan American Wrestling Championships held in Ottawa, Canada. He also competed at the 2020 Pan American Wrestling Olympic Qualification Tournament, also held in Ottawa, Canada, without qualifying for the 2020 Summer Olympics in Tokyo, Japan. He also failed to qualify for the Olympics at the World Olympic Qualification Tournament held in Sofia, Bulgaria.

He won the bronze medal in his event at the 2022 Bolivarian Games held in Valledupar, Colombia.

Achievements

References

External links 
 

Living people
Year of birth missing (living people)
Place of birth missing (living people)
Dominican Republic male sport wrestlers
Pan American Games medalists in wrestling
Pan American Games silver medalists for the Dominican Republic
Medalists at the 2019 Pan American Games
Wrestlers at the 2019 Pan American Games
Pan American Wrestling Championships medalists
21st-century Dominican Republic people